Adam Asghar (born 26 July 1994) is a Scottish football coach and former player who is currently U-18 lead coach at Championship side Sunderland. 

As a player, Asghar had spells with Motherwell, Alloa Athletic, Annan Athletic and Clydebank, as well as Dumbarton and East Stirlingshire on loan.

Early life
Asghar was born in Glasgow on 26 July 1994. He is of partial Pakistani descent through his father, Tony Asghar, who was a youth footballer at Rangers in the 1980s before becoming a police officer and football agent.

Playing career
A product of the Motherwell youth system, Asghar was a regular for the under-20 side in the 2012-13 season. On 29 March 2013, Asghar joined Scottish First Division side Dumbarton on loan till the end of the season. On 20 May 2013, it was confirmed that Asghar would not have his Motherwell contract extended, making him a free agent. In September 2013, he went on trial at Greenock Morton, playing in reserve matches against East Stirlingshire and Dundee.

He signed for Alloa Athletic in July 2014. On 4 March 2015, Asghar signed for East Stirlingshire on a one-month loan.

Ashgar left Alloa at the end of the 2015–16 season, signing for Annan Athletic in July 2016. He left Annan in the 2017 close season. After a spell playing and coaching in the United States, he joined junior club Clydebank as a trialist December 2017, prior to officially registering with the club at the beginning of 2018. He was unable to remain regularly committed in the 2018–19 season due to changed work commitments, and subsequently left the club.

Coaching career
Asghar holds a UEFA Elite Youth A coaching licence. He worked as a coach with Motherwell's under-16 and under-18 teams, and for the Scottish Football Association's Performance School programme at Braidhurst High School. In March 2019, he became senior academy head coach at Dundee United, where his father Tony Asghar was already sporting director.

In October 2022, he moved to Championship side Sunderland as lead coach of the U-18 team.

Career statistics

See also
British Asians in association football

References

External links
 

1994 births
Living people
Footballers from Glasgow
Scottish footballers
Association football midfielders
Motherwell F.C. players
Dumbarton F.C. players
Scottish Football League players
Alloa Athletic F.C. players
East Stirlingshire F.C. players
Annan Athletic F.C. players
Clydebank F.C. players
Scottish Junior Football Association players
Scottish Professional Football League players
Dundee United F.C. non-playing staff
Motherwell F.C. non-playing staff
British Asian footballers
Scottish people of Pakistani descent
Sunderland A.F.C. non-playing staff